Mathew Madiro (born September 30, 1991) is an American musician. He is the current drummer for From Ashes to New and former drummer of heavy metal band Trivium. He was also the touring drummer for The Word Alive.

Career
Mathew Madiro played his first Trivium show on May 5, 2014 in Buffalo, NY, as Nick Augusto departed from the band the day before, while the band still was on a co-headlining tour with Volbeat. He had been working for Trivium as a drum technician for 2 years and did not have any experience as a touring musician or recording artist, except for practicing in some amateur local bands. Reportedly, he had only 24 hours to learn all his parts for the upcoming show.

On July 30, 2015 Trivium released a music video for the title track off the upcoming 7th album Silence in the Snow. The video became the second featuring Madiro, with Vengeance Falls "Through Blood and Dirt and Bone" being the first.

On October 24, 2015 Madiro played a show at San Manuel Amphitheater, which later turned out to be his final as a member of Trivium. In December 2015, shortly before Knotfest in Mexico, it was announced that the band had decided to part ways with Madiro on amicable terms. When asked, if he was going to switch back to his previous position as a drum tech in Trivium, he stated that he was not.

In February 2016, he was invited to play with From Ashes to New because their drummer Tim D'Onofrio married and left on honeymoon. Madiro was announced as the band's new drummer for the band on March 12, 2017.

In 2021, he joined The Word Alive as a touring drummer, following the departure of Matt Horn.

Discography

With Trivium
 Silence in the Snow (2015)

With From Ashes To New
 The Future (2018)
 Panic (2020)

References

External links

1991 births
Living people
American heavy metal drummers
People from Honey Brook, Pennsylvania
21st-century American drummers